The Water Polo by the Sea is an annual four-day international water polo event, staged at the Bondi Icebergs Club, The Rocks and Circular Quay in Sydney, Australia from 2011.

References

External links
 
 

International water polo competitions
International water polo competitions hosted by Australia
Sports competitions in Sydney
Recurring sporting events established in 2011
2011 establishments in Australia
Bondi, New South Wales